Oncideres glebulenta is a species of beetle in the family Cerambycidae. It was described by Martins in 1981. It is known from Argentina and Brazil.

References

glebulenta
Beetles described in 1981